Sagar Kashyap is a former under-18 tennis player from Mysore, Karnataka, India, and the youngest Indian to officiate at the Wimbledon Championship.

Biography 
Kashyap, hailing from Mysore started playing tennis at the age of 12. He is a former under-18 junior ITF player and has played at various national and international tournaments.

Kashyap, a computer engineer from Vidya Vikas Engineering college in Mysore started off as a line umpire in 2005 for Fed cup in New Delhi and had also participated as a line umpire in ITF events in Bangalore. Kashyap then rose to the rank of a supervisor and was a level 1 chair umpire in ITF events which entitled him to officiate up to second round. Sagar attended a workshop in Mumbai and became a white badge umpire. In an interview to a news paper Sagar stated "I was a national level player but turned towards umpiring. I cleared an ITF exam after which I became an International White Badge official. And now, I got a chance to travel to London and officiate in the qualifiers which is a huge boost to my career,". He became the youngest Indian to officiate in Wimbledon Championship in 2011

References 

Indian male tennis players
Living people
Year of birth missing (living people)
Sportspeople from Mysore
Racket sportspeople from Karnataka